Holliday High School is a public high school located in Holliday, Texas, United States, and classified as a 3A school by the UIL. It is part of the Holliday Independent School District located in northwestern Archer County. In 2013, the school was rated "Met Standard" by the Texas Education Agency.

Athletics
The Holliday Eagles compete in the following sports 

Baseball
Basketball
Cross Country
Football
Golf
Softball
Tennis
Track and Field
Volleyball

Lone Star Cup titles 
1998-1999
1999-2000
2001-2002
2003-2004
2004-2005

State titles
Girls Basketball
2023 (3A)
Girls Cross Country 
2004 (2A), 2005 (2A), 2021 (3A)
Boys Track 
1998 (2A), 1999 (2A)
Boys Tennis Doubles 
1957 (B), 1958 (B)

Academics
UIL Academic Meet Champions 
2009(2A), 2010(2A), 2015(3A), 2017(3A), 2019(3A), 2021(3A)

Band
Marching Band State Champions 
1993(2A), 1999(2A), 2001(2A)

Notable alumni
Zach Stewart, baseball player

References

External links
Holliday ISD

Schools in Archer County, Texas
Public high schools in Texas